The Best Is Yet to Come is a 1982 studio album by the American jazz singer Ella Fitzgerald, accompanied by a studio orchestra arranged and conducted by Nelson Riddle.

The last of Fitzgerald's six collaborations with Riddle, their work together on the Verve label more than fifteen years earlier is considered some of Fitzgerald's finest, both musically and critically.

Fitzgerald's performance on the album won her the 1984 Grammy Award for Best Jazz Vocal Performance, Female, one of three Grammys she won for her work with Riddle.

Reception

In his biography of Riddle, September In the Rain, Peter J. Levinson wrote that the album "...simply wasn't the best. In fact it was a near disaster. The raggedy tone of Ella's voice couldn't be disguised".

Track listing
 "Don't Be That Way" (Benny Goodman, Mitchell Parish, Edgar Sampson) – 4:03
 "God Bless the Child" (Arthur Herzog Jr., Billie Holiday) – 4:42
 "(I Wonder) Where Our Love Has Gone" (Buddy Johnson) – 3:48
 "You're Driving Me Crazy" (Walter Donaldson) – 3:27
 "Any Old Time" (Artie Shaw) – 4:19
 "Goodbye" (Gordon Jenkins) – 3:58
 "Autumn in New York" (Vernon Duke) – 3:24
 "The Best Is Yet to Come" (Cy Coleman, Carolyn Leigh) – 5:19
 "Deep Purple" (Peter DeRose, Parish) – 4:04
 "Somewhere in the Night" (Milton Raskin, Billy May) – 3:07

Personnel
 Ella Fitzgerald - vocals
 Christine Ermacoff, Barbara Hunter, Dennis Karmazyn, Jerome Kessler, Robert L. Martin, Judith Perett, Frederick Seykora, Nancy Stein - cello
 Bill Green, Ronnie Lang, Ronald Langinger, Hubert Laws, Wilbur Schwartz - flute 
 David Duke, Joe Meyer, Gale Robinson - french horn
 Marshal Royal - alto saxophone
 Al Aarons - trumpet
 Bob Cooper - tenor saxophone
 Bill Watrous - trombone
 Tommy Tedesco, Joe Pass - guitar
 Richard Klein - guitar, french horn
 Art Hillery - organ
 Jim Hughart - double bass
 Shelly Manne - drums
 Jimmy Rowles - piano
 Nelson Riddle - arranger, conductor

References

1982 albums
Albums arranged by Nelson Riddle
Albums produced by Norman Granz
Ella Fitzgerald albums
Grammy Award for Best Jazz Vocal Performance, Female
Pablo Records albums